Wellsburg is the name of several communities in the United States.
 Wellsburg, Indiana
 Wellsburg, Iowa
 Wellsburg, Kentucky
 Wellsburg, New York
 Wellsburg, North Dakota
 Wellsburg, West Virginia

Other:
Wellsburg (PCH), the codename for an Intel chipset